A web series (also known as a web show) is a series of scripted or non-scripted online videos, generally in episodic form, released on the Internet, which first emerged in the late 1990s and became more prominent in the early 2000s. A single instance of a web series program can be called an episode or a "webisode", however the term is not always used. In general, web series can be watched on a range of platforms and devices, including desktop, laptop, tablets and smartphones. They are different from streaming television, which is purposed to be watched on various streaming platforms. Because of the nature of the Internet itself, a web series may be interactive. Web series are classified as new media. But before being released into television, cinemas or film festivals, the time requires between a week and 3 years. When the time is passed then the Web series are no longer useful for TV, cinema or film festival schedules.

As of 2016, there were a number of awards that have been established to celebrate excellence in web series, like the Streamys, Webbys, IAWTV, and Indie Series Awards, although the Streamys and IAWTV also cover programs on streaming platforms. There are also several web series festivals, most notably in Los Angeles and Vancouver. Most major award ceremonies have also created web series and digital media award categories, including the Emmy Awards and the Canadian Screen Awards.

History

1990s 
In April 1995, "Global Village Idiots", an episode of the Bloomington, Indiana-based public access program Rox, was uploaded to the Internet, making Rox the first series distributed via the web. The same year, Scott Zakarin created The Spot, an episodic online story which integrated photos, videos, and blogs into the storyline. Likened to Melrose Place-on-the-Web, The Spot featured a rotating cast of characters playing trendy twenty-somethings who rented rooms in a fabled Santa Monica, California beach house called "The Spot". The Spot earned the title of Infoseek's "Cool Site of the Year," an award which later became the Webby.

In January 1999, Showtime licensed the animated sci-fi web series WhirlGirl, making it the first independently produced web series licensed by a national television network. In February 1999, the series premiered simultaneously on Showtime and online.  The character occasionally appeared on Showtime, for example hosting a "Lethal Ladies" programming block, but spent most of her time online, appearing in 100 webisodes.

2000s
As broadband bandwidth began to increase in speed and availability, delivering high-quality video over the Internet became a reality. In the early 2000s, the Japanese anime industry began broadcasting original net animation (ONA), a type of original video animation (OVA) series, on the Internet. Early examples of ONA series include Infinite Ryvius: Illusion (2000), Ajimu (2001), and Mahou Yuugi (2001). In 2003, The Spot executive producer and head writer Stewart St. John revived the brand for online audiences with a new cast, and created a separate mobile series to air on Sprint PCS Vision-enabled phones. St. John and partner Todd Fisher produced over 2,500 daily videos of the first American mobile phone soap, driving story lines across platforms to the web counterpart, The Spot (2.0).

The same year, Microsoft launched MSN Video, which featured the original web series Weird TV 2000, a spin-off of the syndicated television series Weird TV. The web series featured dozens of shorts, comedy sketches, and mini-documentaries produced exclusively for MSN video. The video-sharing site YouTube was launched in early 2005, allowing users to share television programs. YouTube co-founder Jawed Karim said the inspiration for YouTube first came from Janet Jackson's role in the 2004 Super Bowl incident, when her breast was exposed during her performance, and later from the 2004 Indian Ocean tsunami. Karim could not easily find video clips of either event online, which led to the idea of a video sharing site.

From 2003 to 2006, many independent web series began to garner and achieve significant popularity, most notably the series known as Red vs. Blue by Rooster Teeth. The series was distributed independently using online portals YouTube and Revver, as well as the Rooster Teeth website, acquiring over 100 million social media views during its run. Rooster Teeth would eventually create RWBY in 2013. Sam Has 7 Friends, which ran in the summer and fall of 2006, was nominated for a Daytime Emmy Award, and was temporarily removed from the Internet when it was acquired by Michael Eisner. In 2004–2005, Spanish producer Pedro Alonso Pablos recorded a series of video interviews featuring actors and directors like Guillermo del Toro, Santiago Segura, Álex de la Iglesia, and Keanu Reeves, which were distributed through his own website. lonelygirl15, California Heaven, "The Burg", and SamHas7Friends also gained popularity during this time, acquiring audiences in the millions. Lonelygirl15 was so successful that it secured a sponsorship deal with Neutrogena. In 2007, the creators of Lonelygirl15 followed up the series' success with KateModern, a series which debuted on social network Bebo, and took place in the same fictional universe as their previous show. Big Fantastic created and produced Prom Queen, which was financed and distributed by Vuguru, and debuted on MySpace. These web serials highlighted interactivity with the audience in addition to the narrative on relatively low budgets. In contrast, the web series Sanctuary, starring actor/producer Amanda Tapping, cost $4.3 Million to produce. Both Sanctuary and Prom Queen were nominated for a Daytime Emmy Award. Award-winning producer/director Marshall Herskovitz created Quarterlife, which debuted on MySpace and was later distributed on NBC. In 2009, the first web series festival was established, called the Los Angeles Web Series Festival. 

In 2008, major television studios began releasing web series, such as the ABC show "Squeegies", the NBC show Gemini Division, and the Bravo show The Malan Show. Warner Bros. relaunched The WB as an online network beginning with their first original web series, "Sorority Forever", created and produced by Big Fantastic and executive produced by McG. Meanwhile, MTV announced a new original series created by Craig Brewer that brought together the indie music world and new media expansion. Joss Whedon created, produced and self-financed Dr. Horrible's Sing-Along Blog starring Neil Patrick Harris and Felicia Day. Big Fantastic wrote and produced Foreign Body, a mystery web series that served as a prequel to Robin Cook's novel of the same name. Beckett and Goodfried founded a new Internet studio, EQAL, and produced a spin-off from "lonelygirl15" entitled "LG15: The Resistance". Dedicated media coverage of the web series debuted with organizations such as GigaOm's NewTeeVee and Tubefilter News. Mainstream press also began to provide coverage. In the UK, KateModern ended its run on Bebo. That site also hosted a six-month-long reality/travel show, The Gap Year, produced by Endemol UK, who also made Kirill, a drama for MSN.

During MipCom, in October 2008, MySpace announced plans for a second series and indicated that it was in talks with cable network Foxtel to distribute their first series on network television. Additionally MySpace spoke of their plans to produce versions of the MySpace Road Tour in other countries. The emerging potential for success in web video caught the attention of top entertainment executives in America, including former Disney executive and current head of the Tornante Company, Michael Eisner. Torante's Vuguru subdivision partnered with Canadian media conglomerate Rogers Media on October 26, securing plans to produce upwards of 30 new web shows a year. Rogers Media agreed to help fund and distribute Vuguru's upcoming productions, thereby solidifying a connection between old and new media.

Production and distribution
The rise in the popularity of the Internet and improvements the accessibility and affordability of high speed broadband and streaming video technology meant that producing and distributing a web series became a feasible alternative to "traditional" series production, which was formerly mostly done for broadcast and cable TV. In comparison with traditional TV series production, web series are less expensive to produce. This has allowed a wider range of creators to develop web series. As well, since web series are made available online, instead of being aired at a single preset time to specific regions, they enable producers to reach a potentially global audience who can access the shows 24 hours a day and seven days a week, at the time of their choosing. Moreover, in the 2010s, the rising affordability of tablets and smartphones and the rising ownership rates of these devices in industrialized nations means that web series are available to a wider range of potential viewers, including commuters, travelers, and other people who are on the go.

The emerging potential for success in web video has caught the eye of some of the top entertainment executives in America, including former Disney executive and current head of the Tornante Company, Michael Eisner.  Eisner's Vuguru subdivision of Tornante partnered with Canadian media conglomerate Rogers Media on October 26, 2009, securing plans to produce over 30 new web shows a year.  Rogers Media will help fund and distribute Vuguru's upcoming productions, solidifying a connection between traditional media and new media such as web series. Web series can be distributed directly from the producers' websites, through streaming services or via online video sharing websites .

Web 2.0
A number of web series incorporate interactive Web 2.0 features on their producer's websites, the show website, or other online fora. These Web 2.0 features enable viewers and fans to post comments online about episodes and link or "tag" favorite shows, episodes or video clips. These activities help to build viewer and fan engagement. Some producers use social media and social networking websites for the promotion of their web series and seek new viewers. As well, some producers monitor social media and networking comments as a way to obtain fan feedback on their shows.
A web series is simply a series of web videos, usually in serial form, posted on the Internet, that first appeared in the late 1990s and gained popularity in the early to mid-2000s. In this new digital millennium, a web series can reach a wide international audience just by making a quick and cleverly produced video. A web series can consist of an ensemble cast who create their own online characters to tell a story over the Internet. Some shows may use special computer-generated technology to create a virtual world filled with interactive interfaces and visual effects.

Awards
The Webby Awards, established in 1995, and the Indie Series Awards, established in 2009, recognize top web series in the comedy, drama, and reality TV categories. In 2009, the International Academy of Web Television was founded with the mission to organize and support the community of streaming television creators, actors, producers and executives. It administered the selection of winners for the Streamy Awards, (which awards streaming television and web series content,) in 2009 and 2010. Due to poor reception and execution from the 2010 Streamy Awards, the IAWTV decided to halt its production of the award ceremony. The IAWTV followed this decision by forming their own award presentation, the IAWTV Awards.

LGBT representation

LGBT representation in web series has increased over the years, as many web series have featured LGBTQ characters. The Rooster Teeth animated web series, RWBY included a trans woman named May Marigold, voiced by Kdin Jenzen. while Nomad of Nowhere, another RoosterTeeth show, released in 2018, featured a lesbian protagonist named Skout, who had a crush on Captain Toth, her superior. Hazbin Hotel, by Vivienne Medrano, centers around a bisexual princess of Hell named Charlie, with a girlfriend named Vaggie, and an asexual character named Alastor. Medrano's other series, Helluva Boss, featured various bisexual characters, such as demon named Moxxie. My Pride: The Series, which premiered in February 2020 on YouTube, follows a "queer, disabled lioness" named Nothing who is trying to heal the world. Nico Colaleo's animated web series, Too Loud, includes an LGBTQ protagonist, Desiree, who comes out as trans in the episode "Slumber Party Sneak-In".

See also 
 List of web series
 Streaming television
 Channel 101
 NewTeeVee
 Original net animation
 Podcast
 Streamy Awards
 Tubefilter

References

 
Computer-related introductions in 1995
New media
Digital media
Broadcasting